Decatur–Federal (sometimes stylized as Decatur•Federal) is an at-grade light rail station on the W Line of the RTD Rail system. It is located alongside the banks of the Lakewood Gulch between its intersections with Decatur Street and Federal Boulevard, after which the station is named, in Denver, Colorado. The station is located in the Sun Valley neighborhood, near the point where Lakewood Gulch meets the South Platte River. It is one of two light rail stops that serve Empower Field at Mile High, the home stadium of the Denver Broncos. The stop is adjacent to Rude Park.

The station opened on April 26, 2013, on the West Corridor, built as part of the Regional Transportation District (RTD) FasTracks public transportation expansion plan and voter-approved sales tax increase for the Denver metropolitan area.

The station has a multi-gate bus transfer plaza served by RTD Bus routes and a 474 space park and ride lot.

References 

RTD light rail stations in Denver
W Line (RTD)
Railway stations in the United States opened in 2013
2013 establishments in Colorado